Ratnagiri Superfast Express is a Superfast Express train of the Indian Railways connecting  in Maharashtra and  of Uttar Pradesh. It is currently being operated with 12165/12166 train numbers on a three-day a week basis.

Service

The 12165/Gorakhpur SF Express has an average speed of 57 km/hr and covers 1707 km in 29 hrs 50 mins. 12166/Gorakhpur SF Express has an average speed of 59 km/hr and covers 1707 km in 29 hrs 30 mins.

Route and halts 

The important halts of the train are:

Coach composition

The train has modern LHB coach with max speed of 110 kmph. The train consists of 22 coaches:

 1 AC II Tier
 4 AC III Tier
 11 sleeper coaches
 3 general
 1 pantry car
 1 general cum brake van
 1 EOG

Traction
Gorakhpur Express is mostly hauled by Kalyan-based WAP-7, From Prayagraj Junction the train is hauled by Gaziabad-based WAP-7 electric locomotive til Gorakhpur and vice versa.

Direction reversal

The train reverses its direction two times:

Rake sharing 

This train shares its rake with 22179/22180 Lokmanya Tilak Terminus–MGR Chennai Central Weekly Express.

See also 

 Lokmanya Tilak Terminus
 Varanasi Junction railway station
 Lokmanya Tilak Terminus–Varanasi Express
 Lokmanya Tilak Terminus–Gorakhpur Express
 Lokmanya Tilak Terminus–Chennai Central Weekly Express

Notes

External links 

 12165/Ratnagiri Superfast Express
 12166/Ratnagiri Superfast Express

References 

Passenger trains originating from Varanasi
Transport in Mumbai
Express trains in India
Rail transport in Maharashtra
Rail transport in Madhya Pradesh
Railway services introduced in 2010